Argyroploce concretana is a species of moth belonging to the family Tortricidae.

It is native to Europe and Northwestern America.

References

Olethreutini
Moths described in 1862